Arborio may refer to:

 Arborio, Piedmont, a small town and commune in the province of Vercelli, north-west Italy
 Arborio rice, a variety which is named after the town
 Arborio (surname)